The 2017 All-Ireland Under-17 Hurling Championship was the first and only staging of the All-Ireland Under-17 Hurling Championship, the Gaelic Athletic Association's primary inter-county hurling championship for boys under the age of seventeen. The championship began on 11 April 2017 and ended on 6 August 2017.

On 6 August 2017, Cork won the championship following a 1–19 to 1–17 defeat of Dublin in the All-Ireland final.

Fixtures/results

Leinster Under-17 Hurling Championship

First round

Second round

Quarter-finals

Semi-finals

Final

Munster Under-17 Hurling Championship

Quarter-finals

Semi-finals

Final

All-Ireland Under-17 Hurling Championship

Semi-finals

Final

External links
 Results and fixtures

References

All-Ireland Under-17 Hurling Championship